Sloan may refer to:

Sloan (surname)
MIT Sloan School of Management at the Massachusetts Institute of Technology, United States
Sloan (band), a Canadian rock band
Sloan Digital Sky Survey, a major astronomical survey
Sloan Great Wall, a galactic filament discovered by the Sloan Digital Sky Survey
Sloan Fellowship, a research grant to young scientists and scholars
Sloan Research Fellowship, a mid-career master's degree program in general management
Sloan Valve Company, a manufacturer of plumbing systems
Urania sloanus or Sloan's urania, a species of moth
Alfred P. Sloan Foundation, a large philanthropic organization

Places
 Sloan, Indiana, an extinct town in Warren County
 Sloan, Iowa, a city in Woodbury County
 Sloan, Nevada, an unincorporated community in Clark County
 Sloan, New York, a village in Erie County
 Sloan Creek (disambiguation)
 Sloan Lake (Minnesota), a lake in Minnesota
 Mount Sloan, a mountain in British Columbia
 Sloan Peak, a mountain in Washington state
 Sloan's Lake, a lake in Colorado
 Sloan Site, a Paleo-Indian Dalton cemetery in Arkansas

Fictional characters
Sloan McQuewick, a character in the TV series Entourage
Sloane Peterson, Ferris Bueller's girlfriend in the 1986 film Ferris Bueller's Day Off and the 1990s television series of the same name

See also
Sloane (disambiguation)
Slone (disambiguation) 
Justice Sloan (disambiguation)